"Now That I've Found You" is a song by Dutch DJ and record producer Martin Garrix, featuring Swedish singer John Martin and record producer, singer and songwriter Michel Zitron. It was released as a digital download on 11 March 2016. A music video was later released on YouTube. This song was the first released off Martin Garrix's record label Stmpd Rcrds, and was notably later played during his closing set of Sziget Festival.

Composition
"Now That I've Found You" is the vocal version of the instrumental track "Don't Crack Under Pressure". The melody of the track was created at the Dutch dance event called DanceFair 2015. The track has a tempo of 128 BPM and is composed in the F minor scale.

Charts

Release history

References

2016 singles
2016 songs
John Martin (singer) songs
Martin Garrix songs
Songs written by Martin Garrix
Songs written by Michel Zitron
Songs written by John Martin (singer)
Stmpd Rcrds singles